Crozer Arboretum, now the Crozer Garden, is a  arboretum and garden park located at 1 Medical Center Boulevard, Upland, Pennsylvania. The grounds are open daily; admission is free.

The park was formerly the campus of the Crozer Theological Seminary, the buildings of the seminary are currently used as office space by the Crozer-Chester Medical Center. The arboretum features large specimen trees dating from the mid-19th century, more than 1,400 rhododendrons, native herbaceous plants and shrubs, lawns, two ponds, natural springs, and walkways. The campus also features the  Leona Gold Garden and Crozer Greenhouse.

Notes

References
 
 
 The Morton Register of Arboreta
 GardenVisit entry (with photographs)
 Dave's Garden entry

See also
 List of botanical gardens in the United States

Arboreta in Pennsylvania
Botanical gardens in Pennsylvania
Chester, Pennsylvania
Parks in Delaware County, Pennsylvania